Guinea competed in the Olympic Games for the first time at the 1968 Summer Olympics in Mexico City, Mexico.

Guinea sent only a football team.

Football

Group stage

Group A

References
Official Olympic Reports

Nations at the 1968 Summer Olympics
1968
1968 in Guinea